The VTB United League 2011–12 was the third complete season of the VTB United League, which is Northern Europe and Eastern Europe's top-tier level men's professional club basketball competition. The tournament featured 18 teams, from 10 countries.

Participants

Qualifying round

Group A

Group B

Final round

Regular season

Group A

Group B

Playoff round

1/8 Final
The teams that finished third in their group play against the fourth placed teams in the other group in a Best-Of-3 series with home advantage.

1/4 Final
The teams that finished second in their group play against the winners of the 1/8 final in a Best-Of-3 series with home advantage.

Final four

Semifinals

Third-place game

Final

Awards

MVP of the Month
October 2011: Patrick Beverley (Spartak St. Petersburg)
November 2011: Rawle Marshall (Astana)
December 2011: Tre Simmons (CEZ Nymburk)
January 2012: Michał Ignerski (Nizhny Novgorod)
February 2012: Jonas Valančiūnas (Lietuvos Rytas)
March 2012: Vladimir Veremeenko (UNICS Kazan)
April 2012: Jeremiah Massey (Lokomotiv Kuban)

All-Tournament team
Patrick Beverley (Spartak St. Petersburg)
Henry Domercant (UNICS Kazan)
Andrei Kirilenko (CSKA Moscow)
Krešimir Lončar (Khimki Moscow Region)
Jonas Valančiūnas (Lietuvos Rytas)

All-Final Four Team
Henry Domercant (UNICS Kazan)
K.C. Rivers (Lokomotiv Kuban)
Andrei Kirilenko (CSKA Moscow)
Darjuš Lavrinovič (CSKA Moscow)
Jonas Valančiūnas (Lietuvos Rytas)

MVPs

External links 
Official Website 
Official Website 

2011-12
2011–12 in European basketball leagues
2011–12 in Russian basketball
2011–12 in Lithuanian basketball
2011–12 in Ukrainian basketball
2011–12 in Latvian basketball
2011–12 in Estonian basketball
2011–12 in Polish basketball
2011–12 in Belarusian basketball
2011–12 in Finnish basketball
2011–12 in Kazakhstani basketball
2011–12 in Czech basketball